Polarization is an album by American jazz trombonist and composer Julian Priester recorded in 1977 and released on the ECM label.

Reception
The Allmusic review by Richard S. Ginell awarded the album 4 stars stating "This is an often engaging record from a trombonist too seldom heard as a leader".

Track listing
All compositions by Julian Priester
 "Polarization" - 5:01   
 "Rhythm Magnet" - 8:31   
 "Wind Dolphin" - 8:59  
 "Coincidence" - 3:38   
 "Scorpio Blue" - 9:36    
 "Anatomy of Longing" - 8:29  
Recorded at Tonstudio Bauer in Ludwigsburg, West Germany in January 1977

Personnel
Julian Priester - trombone, ARP String Ensemble
Ron Stallings - tenor saxophone, soprano saxophone
Ray Obiedo - electric guitar, acoustic guitar
Curtis Clark - piano
Heshima Mark Williams - electric bass
Augusta Lee Collins - drums

References

ECM Records albums
Julian Priester albums
1977 albums
Albums produced by Manfred Eicher